"Shake My" (explicitly Shake My Ass) is the official first single by Three 6 Mafia from their upcoming tenth studio album Laws of Power. It features Kalenna of Diddy's group Dirty Money and Pitbull (uncredited) and was produced by Rodney "Darkchild" Jerkins, making it one of the handful of Three 6 Mafia singles not produced by them.

Charts

References

2009 singles
Three 6 Mafia songs
Songs written by Juicy J
2009 songs
Columbia Records singles
Songs written by Kalenna Harper
Songs written by DJ Paul
Songs written by Pitbull (rapper)